Bet Yehoshua railway station (Taḥanat HaRakevet Beit Yehoshua) is an Israel Railways passenger station located in Beit Yehoshua and serves the village and the southern part of the city of Netanya, with its large industrial zones, as well as other small communities in the area.

Train service
The station mostly serves suburban trains on the Binyamina–Tel Aviv–Beersheba, Netanya–Tel Aviv–Rehovot and Netanya–Tel Aviv–Beit Shemesh suburban lines with a total of four stops at the station in each direction per hour at peak times and two stops at off-peak times.

Platform 1 is used for southbound suburban or intercity trains, while platform 2 is used for northbound suburban or intercity trains. The station is situated between Netanya Sapir railway station to the north and Herzliya railway station to the south.

A small spur rail exists north of platform 2, housing a rail maintenance vehicle.

Station layout
Platform numbers increase in an East-to-West direction

Ridership

References

External links
Israel Railways website

Railway stations in Central District (Israel)
Netanya